Marian Stuart (born 6 December 1954) is a Canadian former swimmer. She competed in two events at the 1972 Summer Olympics.

References

External links
 

1954 births
Living people
Canadian female swimmers
Olympic swimmers of Canada
Swimmers at the 1972 Summer Olympics
Swimmers from Montreal
Commonwealth Games medallists in swimming
Commonwealth Games gold medallists for Canada
Commonwealth Games silver medallists for Canada
Commonwealth Games bronze medallists for Canada
Swimmers at the 1974 British Commonwealth Games
Swimmers at the 1978 Commonwealth Games
Pan American Games medalists in swimming
Pan American Games bronze medalists for Canada
Swimmers at the 1975 Pan American Games
Medalists at the 1975 Pan American Games
20th-century Canadian women
21st-century Canadian women
Universiade medalists in swimming
Universiade gold medalists for Canada
Medallists at the 1974 British Commonwealth Games
Medallists at the 1978 Commonwealth Games